Prussia and its predecessor, Brandenburg-Prussia, were involved in numerous conflicts during their existence as nation-states. During their military engagements they often fulfilled the role of a supporting power, especially in the 17th century. In the 18th century Prussia began to adopt an independent role in the conflicts of that time; at the latest by the time of the Silesian Wars.

Prussia's Army won major victories like at Leuthen, Leipzig, Waterloo, Königgrätz and Sedan but also suffered devastating defeats such as at Kunersdorf and Jena-Auerstedt.

This article lists all the wars and battles in which Brandenburg-Prussia and the Kingdom of Prussia were militarily engaged in, covering the period from 1618 to 1871.

Wars

First Northern War (1656–1660) 

The First Northern War (also Second or Little Northern War) was a conflict that took place from 1655 to 1661 between Poland, Sweden and Russia for supremacy in the Baltic states. Brandenburg fought initially on the side of Sweden against Poland, but changed sides, after Poland granted its prince-elector sovereignty over the Duchy of Prussia in the Treaty of Wehlau on 19 September 1657. Brandenburg succeeded in gaining ultimate sovereignty over the Duchy of Prussia and proved itself during the war as an important military and political power.

Franco-Dutch War and Swedish-Brandenburg War (1674–1679) 
The Swedish-Brandenburg War was part of the Franco-Dutch War, and was a conflict between the Electorate of Brandenburg and Kingdom of Sweden for the domination of Pomerania. In this war, Sweden was an ally of France, whilst Brandenburg-Prussia, together with Austria, Denmark and Spain, fought on the side of the Dutch. At the end of 1674, Swedish troops invaded Brandenburg, but were successfully repulsed by the Brandenburg army.

Great Turkish War (1683–1699)

Nine Years' War (1688–1697)

Spanish War of Succession (1701–1714) 

In the Crown Treaty signed on 16 November 1700, Elector Frederick III had undertaken to provide a body of 8,000 men for the impending Spanish War of Succession for Emperor Leopold I. In return, the emperor promised that Frederick's future self-coronation as "King in Prussia" would be recognised across Europe and the Holy Roman Empire. The coronation took place on 18 January 1701 in Königsberg and from April 1701 the now entitled Royal Prussian Contingent deployed to the Lower Rhine at Wesel. In April 1702 it took part in hostilities for the first time at the Siege of Kaiserswerth.

Great Northern War (1700–1721) 

After the death of his father, King Frederick William I joined the coalition against the Swedish king, Charles XII, with the aim of capturing the Swedish territories in Pomerania. As a result, the Prussian occupied Stettin in 1713. In November 1714, when Charles XII took personal command of Swedish Pomerania, the Prussian Army, together with the Saxons and Danes, was able to force him back to Stralsund in 1715–16 during the Pomeranian campaign and besiege him there. After the end of the war Prussia gained Stettin, Usedom and all territories south of the Peene.

Austrian War of Succession (1740–1748)

First Silesian War (1740–1742) 

In 1740, in the first year of his reign and shortly after his coronation Frederick II sent the Prussian Army to invade Austrian-ruled Silesia and so precipitated the First Silesian War and, in its broader sense, the Austrian War of Succession. Because Prussia allied itself with Bavaria, France, Saxony, the Electorate of Cologne, Spain, Sweden and Naples, whilst Prussia's main enemy, Austria allied itself with Great Britain, Sardinia, the Netherlands and Russia. For Prussia, the war was restricted to Silesia, and was able to capture the province after several victories.

Second Silesian War (1744–1745) 

The Second Silesian War was also part of the Austrian War of Succession, but also a war fought for supremacy in Silesia between Prussia and Austria. Frederick II had allied himself at that time with France. Austria formed an alliance with Saxony, Great Britain and the Netherlands. In August 1744, Prussia ambushed Bohemia with 80,000 soldiers and thereby opened the Second Silesian War. After several hard battles, it was agreed in the Treaty of Dresden that Silesia would always remain in Prussian hands.

Seven Years' War (1756–1763)

Third Silesian War (1756–1763) 

The Seven Years' War, fought between Prussia and Great Britain on one side and Austria, France, Sweden and Russia on the other, involved all the great European powers of the time. In the Third Silesian War (the Austrian-Prussian theatre), Austria's goal was the reconquest of Silesia, but Frederick II pre-empted his enemies, and on 29 August 1756 crossed the border of Saxony without a prior declaration of war. Military success alternated and the Prussian army faced defeat in the end, in spite of major victories. On 15 February 1763 the Peace of Hubertusburg was signed between Prussia and its opponents. The status quo ante was restored. The war established Prussia as the fifth major power in Europe, but Prussia lost 180,000 soldiers during the war.

First Partition of Poland (1772)
Overall, Prussia gained 36,000 km2 and about 600,000 people. According to Jerzy Surdykowski Frederick the Great soon introduced German colonists on territories he conquered and engaged in Germanization of Polish territories.

War of the Bavarian Succession (1778–1779) 
The War of the Bavarian Succession was fought between Prussia, Saxony and Bavaria on one side and Austria on the other.

Revolutionary and Napoleonic Wars (1792–1815) 
The Revolutionary and Napoleonic Wars were a series of conflicts in the late 18th and early 19th centuries between Revolutionary France and later the French Empire and coalitions of various European states.  Prussia was  a member of three of the six anti-French coalitions.

War of the First Coalition (1792–1795)
The War of the First Coalition saw the monarchies of Europe, led by Austria, opposed to revolutionary France. It lasted from 1793 to 1797, though Prussia made peace in 1795.

War of the Fourth Coalition (1806–1807)
The War of the Fourth Coalition saw Prussia and her allies in conflict with France over concerns about the formation of the Confederation of the Rhine and the expansion of Napoleon's influence into Germany. It ended with the defeat of the coalition a year later.

War of the Sixth Coalition (1813–1814) 
The War of the Sixth Coalition saw a re-vitalized Prussia join the allies against the French in 1813, resulting in France's defeat in 1814. 
The German campaign covers all the military engagements that took place from 1813 to 1815 between the troops of Napoleonic France and the allies, consisting of Prussia, Austria, Russia, Sweden and Great Britain. After the liberation of the German nations, the winter campaign of 1814 ended with the abdication of Napoleon and the First Treaty of Paris.

War of the Seventh Coalition (1815) 
The War of the Seventh Coalition, also called the Hundred Days, occurred in the summer of 1815.
Following the short-lived return of Napoleon, his reign was finally ended following his defeat against Great Britain and their Prussian allies in the Waterloo Campaign.

First Schleswig War (1848–1851) 

The First Schleswig War was the first military conflict over the Schleswig-Holstein question, which was about who should rule over the Duchy of Schleswig. The warring parties were, on the one hand the German movement in the duchies of Schleswig and Holstein in conjunction with the majority of nations in the German Confederation (including Prussia), and on the other hand the State of Denmark. This war ended in a decisive Danish victory, but 13 years later the next war broke out.

Second Schleswig War (1864) 

The Second Schleswig War (also the German-Danish War) was a military conflict for the Duchy of Schleswig between the German Confederation and the Kingdom of Denmark. The war ended with the defeat of the Danes. The two victorious powers, Austria and Prussia, initially owned and ruled jointly over the duchies of Schleswig, Holstein and Lauenburg. The strained relationship between the two states worsened however in the period that followed, until finally the Austro-Prussian War broke out in 1866.

Austro-Prussian War (1866) 

The Austro-Prussian War was a military conflict between Austria and Prussia. The war was fought for supremacy in the German lands (aside from Switzerland). It ended with a victory for Prussia (and its allies) over Austria (and its allies) and the dissolution of the German Confederation. Prussia thereby assumed political supremacy over Austria amongst the German nations and founded the North German Confederation.

Franco-Prussian War (1870–1871)

See also 
German Army (German Empire)
List of wars involving Germany
Prussia

Literature 
 Curt Jany: Geschichte of the Preußischen Armyvom 15.Jahrhundert bis 1914. Biblio Verlag, Osnabrück, 1967.
 O. Büsch, W. Neugebauer: Moderne Preußische Geschichte 1648–1947. Vol. 2, 4th Pt. Militärsystem and Gesellschaftsordnung. Verlag de Gruyter, 1981, p. 749–871, .
 Martin Guddat: Handbuch zur Prussian Militärgeschichte 1701–1786. Verlag Mittler, Hamburg, 2001, .
 Karl-Volker Neugebauer: Grundzüge of the German Militärgeschichte. Band 1: Historischer Überblick. 1st edition, Rombach Verlag, Freiburg, 1993, .

External links 
 Information on the battles and wars of Prussian Army
 History of Prussian Army

 
Prussia